Boonie Bears: A Mystical Winter is a 2015 Chinese animated family adventure comedy drama film directed by Ding Liang and Liu Fuyuan. It was released on 30 January 2015. Though being criticized by some Chinese viewers for its similarity to Walt Disney's Frozen.

Plot 
As a cub, two bears heard the legend of a creature who comes into the woods in winter and brings snow and cold. The name is "Neova" and the bear brothers once saw her as a cub. But after a while the winter spirit was spreading snow. It was attacked by winged people and with the help of the bear brothers could escape and recuse the creature (...)

Voice cast 
Chinese cast:
Zhang Wei
Zhang Bingjun
Tan Xiao
Meng Yutian
Sun Yaodong
Zhao Xiaoyu
Xin Yuan
Wan Danqing

English cast:
Rick Jay Glen
Justin J. Wheeler
Paul (Maxx) Rinehart
Siobhan Lumsden 
Ethan Kiely
Jenny Ansell
Che Devereux Scott Rinehart 
Luc Alexander Mainland Rinehart

Box office  
As of 15 February 2015, the film has earned over US$40.13 million in China.

See also
Boonie Bears, the television series
Boonie Bears: To the Rescue, the 2014 film based on the television series

References

2015 animated films
2015 films
2015 computer-animated films
2010s adventure comedy films
2010s children's comedy films
Animated drama films
Animated adventure films
Animated comedy films
Chinese animated films
Animated films based on animated series
Le Vision Pictures films
2015 comedy films
2015 drama films
Boonie Bears films